Persoonia teretifolia is a species of flowering plant in the family Proteaceae and is endemic to the south-west of Western Australia.

Description
Flowering mostly occurs from October to February.

Taxonomy
Persoonia teretifolia was first formally described in 1810 by Robert Brown in the Transactions of the Linnean Society of London.

Distribution and habitat
This geebung grows in heath, mostly in near-coastal areas between Israelite Bay and Albany in the Esperance Plains, Jarrah Forest and Mallee biogeographic regions in the south-west of Western Australia.

Conservation status
Persoonia teretifolia is classified as "not threatened" by the Government of Western Australia Department of Parks and Wildlife.

References

teretifolia
Flora of Western Australia
Proteales of Australia
Plants described in 1810
Taxa named by Robert Brown (botanist, born 1773)